The Massachusetts House of Representatives 2nd Hampshire District or "2nd Hampshire" is an electoral district for the Massachusetts House of Representatives. It consists of the towns of South Hadley, Easthampton, Hadley and precinct 2 of Granby. Democrat Dan Carey of Easthampton has represented the district since 2019.

The current district geographic boundary overlaps with those of the Massachusetts Senate's 1st Hampden and Hampshire district,  2nd Hampden and Hampshire district, and Hampshire, Franklin and Worcester district.

District History
The district has existed in its current form since 2011, but has existed in name since at least 1970.

Former locales
The district previously covered:
 Chesterfield, circa 1872, 1927 
 Cummington, circa 1872, 1927 
 Goshen, circa 1872, 1927 
 Huntington, circa 1927 
 Middlefield, circa 1872, 1927 
 Plainfield, circa 1872, 1927 
 Southampton, circa 1927 
 Westhampton, circa 1927 
 Williamsburg, circa 1927 
 Worthington, circa 1872, 1927

Representatives
 Albert D. Sanders, circa 1859 
 Frank E. Lyman, 1915–1922

Elections
Election data comes from Massachusetts Election Statistics.

2016

2014

2012

2010

2008

See also
 Other Hampshire County districts of the Massachusetts House of Representatives: 1st, 3rd
 Hampshire County districts of the Massachusett Senate: Berkshire, Hampshire, Franklin, and Hampden; 1st Hampden and Hampshire; 2nd Hampden and Hampshire; Hampshire, Franklin and Worcester
 List of former districts of the Massachusetts House of Representatives

Images
Portraits of legislators

References

External links
 Amherst League of Women Voters

House Hampshire 02